Farasfaj (also Romanized as Farsafaj and Faresfaj; also known as Farsfīj) is a city and capital of Qolqol Rud District, in Tuyserkan County, Hamadan Province, Iran. At the 2006 census, its population was 1,608, in 443 families.

References

Populated places in Tuyserkan County
Cities in Hamadan Province